The Redwood Experimental Forest (also Yurok Redwood Experimental Forest, formerly Yurok Experimental Forest) (established 1940) is an experimental forest in Del Norte County, California. The forest is near the mouth of the Klamath River in the California Coast Ranges of Northern California. The  forest is drained by High Prairie Creek. As its name implies, the principal species in the forest is coast redwood (Sequoia sempervirens), but the site also contains Douglas fir, Sitka spruce, western hemlock, and Port Orford cedar. The forest is managed by the United States Forest Service. Tree ages range up to 1,200 years. Topography varies considerably over the forest.

About 45 percent of the total area was clearcut between 1956 and 1985. About 1 percent was harvested in 1981 using the selection system. An additional 23 percent is available for approved manipulative research studies, and 16 percent is preserved in an undisturbed old-growth redwood forest condition in the Yurok Research Natural Area (RNA) established in 1976. 

The Redwood Experimental Forest was designated part of the California Coast Ranges International Biosphere Reserve in 1983.

Climate 

The climate at the Redwood is typically mild and foggy in summer. Annual rainfall averages  and snowfall is uncommon. Precipitation is well in excess of potential evapotranspiration, except for about a month in midsummer.

Geology 
The entire region is underlain by Mesozoic rocks of the Franciscan formation, a complex of raw to slightly metamorphic sedimentary rocks. Rock outcrops are few, and where they do occur, shallow soils and exposure combine to make such sites ecologically unique.

References

External links 

 Yurok Redwood Experimental Forest (1983)

1940 establishments in California
Research forests
National Forests of California
Coast redwood groves